The JPMorgan Chase Building, formerly the Gulf Building, is a 37-story   Art Deco skyscraper in downtown Houston, Texas. Completed in 1929, it remained the tallest building in Houston until 1963, when the Exxon Building surpassed it in height. The building is the Houston headquarters of JPMorgan Chase Bank, and was formerly the headquarters of Texas Commerce Bank.

History
Jesse H. Jones arranged to have the Gulf Building constructed; it was built in 1929. Designed by architects Alfred C. Finn, Kenneth Franzheim, and J. E. R. Carpenter the building is seen as a realization of Eliel Saarinen's second-place-but-acclaimed entry in the Chicago Tribune Tower competition.

The Gulf Oil sign was erected in May 1966 and dismantled in March 1974.

Texas Commerce Bank initiated the restoration of the building in 1989, in what is still considered one of the largest privately funded preservation projects in American history. Recent preservation work included restoring the terrazzo floor in the building's Banking Hall, but keeping the hollows worn into the marble border where generations of customers stood to conduct their banking business. Largely through the efforts of JPMorgan Chase, the former Gulf Building was designated a City of Houston Landmark in 2003. The structure was already a National Historic Civil Engineering Landmark and listed on the National Register of Historic Places.

Texas Commerce Bank also owned another history-making skyscraper in downtown Houston, the neighboring 75-story Texas Commerce Tower, completed in 1982, and now known as the JPMorgan Chase Tower.

In 2010, JPMorgan Chase sold the former Gulf Building to the Brookfield Real Estate Opportunity Fund. Chase will be leasing space from the tower on a long term basis.

Building features
On the ground floor the building has a  retail banking center. The banking center has  ceilings, floors and walls made of marble, and large stained glass windows. The building once had a rotating illuminated Gulf sign on the top, which was removed in March 1974. On August 30, 2010 the 27th floor of the building caught fire. The fire quickly escalated from one, to two, to three alarms within 30 minutes as firefighters tried to battle the blaze with low water pressure.

2010 fire
On August 30, 2010, an alarm was called at about 8pm for a fire on the 27th floor. The Houston Fire Department responded with 3 alarms and 270 men. The fire was officially extinguished at 11:20 pm.  Due to a broken pipe, HFD had to pipe water directly into the building. During the course of extinguishing the blaze, six firefighters were injured. They were taken to a local hospital and later released.

See also
Architecture of Houston

References

External links

Skyscraper office buildings in Houston
National Register of Historic Places in Houston
Office buildings completed in 1929
Historic Civil Engineering Landmarks
Art Deco architecture in Texas
JPMorgan Chase buildings
Buildings and structures in Houston
1929 establishments in Texas
Office buildings on the National Register of Historic Places in Texas
Recorded Texas Historic Landmarks
Alfred C. Finn buildings
Kenneth Franzheim buildings